25iP-NBOMe (2C-iP-NBOMe, NBOMe-2C-iP) is a derivative of the phenethylamine hallucinogen 2C-iP, which acts as a highly potent partial agonist for the human 5-HT2A receptor.

Legality

United Kingdom

References 

2C (psychedelics)
Designer drugs
Isopropyl compounds